The caves of the Mendip Hills are formed by the particular geology of the Mendip Hills: large areas of limestone worn away by water makes it a national centre for caving. The hills conceal the largest underground river system in Britain.

Geology 
The hills consist of anticlines of Carboniferous Limestone lying over Devonian Old Red Sandstone, with the sandstone exposed on the summits. When a surface stream running off the sandstone reaches the limestone it sinks below ground through a "swallet", (also known locally as a "slocker"), continuing on its way down towards sea level by enlarging existing cracks in the rock to form caves, and reappearing at the base of the limestone outcrop. As the water changes route within the hill some caves (or parts of caves) are left dry.

There is a characteristic type of Mendip cave, in which there is an initially steep descent, and then a more level stretch ending in a "sump" as the cave reaches and descends below the prevailing water table. The passages below the water table (which may be accessible by cave diving) often have a loop formation caused by the water flowing down a bedding plane and then rising up a fracture in the rock.

The catchment area of the Cheddar Yeo, which rises in Gough's Cave, measures .

History 

When Banwell Bone Cave was discovered in 1824, it was found to contain a great many animal bones which have been dated as about 80,000 years old.

The earliest scientifically dated human cemetery in Britain was found at Aveline's Hole, in Burrington Combe. The human bone fragments it contained, from about 21 different individuals, are thought to be between roughly 10,200 and 10,400 years old.

Archaeological evidence including pottery, flints, hearths, coins, burials and metalwork from the Mesolithic, Neolithic, Bronze Age, Iron Age and Roman eras have been found in many of the caves.
A number of Mendip caves were found by miners, for example the Banwell Caves which were opened by ochre miners in 1757.

Many caves in the Mendip area were photographed by caver Harry Savory early in the 20th century using huge cameras, glass plates and flash powder. His work has been described as "...of a quality to shame virtually all modern cave photographers". The 1990 book A Man Deep in Mendip: The Caving Diaries of Harry Savory, 1910-1921 provides a diary made by Harry Savory, explained and extended by his son John.

A number of important cave excavations and explorations were undertaken, from the 1920s onwards, by pioneer caver Herbert E. Balch. The caves are recorded in the Mendip Cave Registry and Archive.

Access 

The caves which are easily accessible to the public are at Cheddar Gorge and Wookey Hole, but the vast majority of the caves require specialist equipment and knowledge. Many of the caves are gated and operate leader systems in an attempt to reduce the damage caused when the caves are visited. Local caving groups organise trips and continue to discover new caverns. Some estimates put the number of cavers active on the Mendip Hills over a busy weekend at more than 500.

Cave diving 

Attempts made in the Mendip Hills to traverse from one cave to another through the underground rivers led to the development of cave diving; the first cave dive attempt in Britain took place at Swildon's Hole in 1934.

Sites of special scientific interest 

The cave complexes at St. Dunstan's Well Catchment, Thrupe Lane Swallet, Lamb Leer and Priddy Caves have been identified as geological Site of Special Scientific Interest. There are also caves within the Cheddar Complex SSSI.

List of caves 
A selection of the better known caves are listed below

References

Bibliography

External links 
 Mendip Cave Registry and Archive
 Mendip Caving Group
 Council of Southern Caving Clubs
 Google Map of Mendip Caves from Bracknell District Caving Club
 Cerberus Spelaeological Society

 
Mendip Hills
Mendip Hills
Mendip Hills
Caves, Mendip